Inquisitor minutosternalis is a species of sea snail, a marine gastropod mollusk in the family Pseudomelatomidae, the turrids and allies.

Description

Distribution
This marine species is endemic to Australia and occurs off Western Australia

References

 Kosuge, S. 1993. Report on the family Turridae collected along the northwestern coast of Australia. Bulletin of the Institute of Malacology, Tokyo 6 3: 10-15
 Wells, F.E. 1994. A revision of the Recent Australian species of the turrid genera Inquisitor and Ptychobela. Journal of the Malacological Society of Australasia 15: 71-102

External links
 

minutosternalis
Gastropods described in 1993
Gastropods of Australia